Linn Sheldon (September 20, 1919 – April 23, 2006) was a Cleveland, Ohio-based American children's television host and actor, best known for his character "Barnaby," which was seen in Cleveland for over 30 years.

Biography
Born Linn Richard Sheldon in Norwalk, Ohio, Sheldon had spent the majority of his childhood either homeless or in foster care.  He served in the U.S. Army during World War II, returning to his hometown and working as a nightclub act, later starting on Cleveland, Ohio television in 1948. He became a well-known local radio and television personality in the Cleveland market, especially as the host of the children's show Barnaby.

Barnaby
The character "Barnaby" was originally an elf with pointy ears, with a straw hat who lived in the "Enchanted Forest" and showed cartoons (mostly "Popeye") to his audience of adults and children alike. He eventually became popular enough that his show was aired seven days a week (a supporting character on the show - "Woodrow the Woodsman" - became popular in his own right and was spun off into his own series).

"Barnaby" aired on Cleveland NBC affiliate KYW (now WKYC) channel 3 from 1957-1967.  Sheldon would then reprise the character on then upstart independent Cleveland station WUAB channel 43 (which is now Cleveland's CW affiliate).

"Barnaby" aired on channel 43 from 1969 until 1990.  The character was modified a bit in this new incarnation.  He went from being an elf to more of a kindly older gentleman, who wore his trademark straw hat, an ascot, a blue blazer, and khaki slacks.  The program also switched from taking place in the "Enchanted Forest" to Barnaby's cottage (and towards the end, "Barnaby Park", which resembled a typical suburban park complete with park benches).

"Casper the Friendly Ghost" cartoons became a fixture during Barnaby's WUAB tenure, as well as puppet characters such as:

 "Long John" - the world's only invisible parrot (an empty birdcage which Sheldon supplied a voice for)
 "Clyde" - a little fellow who idolized Barnaby and wore a straw hat and sunglasses
 "O.T. the Other Terrestrial" - an alien character that was created in the early '80s due to the popularity of the film E.T. the Extra-Terrestrial
 "Ranger Rupert" - a dog puppet who was the park ranger at Barnaby Park.

The theme music for "Barnaby" was "A La Claire Fontaine," an arrangement by Robert Farnon of an old French lullaby.

Sheldon would famously end the show with: "If anybody calls, tell them Barnaby said hello. And tell them that I think you are the nicest person in the whole world... Just you." As a result, the character is remembered for the catchphrase "Tell them Barnaby said Hello."

During his entire time as "Barnaby," Sheldon would frequently make personal appearances, especially in hospitals, to entertain and cheer up sick children.

Awards and honors
1992 Silver Circle Award, presented by Lower Great Lakes Chapter - National Academy of Television Arts & Science
1997 inductee - Cleveland Association of Broadcasters Hall of Fame

Personal life
Sheldon made headlines in 1975 when he sought treatment for alcoholism.

During the '70s and into the early 1980s, Sheldon (while also doing Barnaby) co-hosted a daily morning talk show titled 43 A.M., which was WUAB's version of the popular Morning Exchange airing on rival WEWS (Cleveland's ABC affiliate).

Sheldon ended his run as "Barnaby" in 1990 and went into retirement.  He released his memoir Barnaby and Me in 2003 and died in Lakewood, Ohio on April 23, 2006.

References

Further reading
Sheldon, Linn (2004). Barnaby and Me. Cleveland, OH: Gray & Company, Publishers.

External links

 A sample chapter from the book Barnaby and Me by Linn Sheldon
 It's Time for Uncle Leslie (1956) - Cinécraft Productions made-for-TV pilot for Jules Power Productions, Inc.

1919 births
2006 deaths
Television personalities from Cleveland
People from Norwalk, Ohio
American male actors
American children's television presenters
United States Army personnel of World War II